This list of Oregon birds lists wild bird species found in the U.S. state of Oregon and accepted by the Oregon Bird Records Committee (OBRC). As of August 2022, there are 547 species on the list. Of them, 164 are on the review list (see below). Nine species were introduced to Oregon or elsewhere in North America; one of them and two others have been extirpated from the state.

Bird counts often change depending on factors such as the number and training of the observers, as well as opinions about what constitutes an officially recognized subspecies. Though northern climes typically do not support as many species as southerly locations, Oregon is fifth in bird species diversity in the United States, behind Florida, New Mexico, Texas and California. This amount of diversity is attributable to Oregon's numerous distinctive ecoregions and relatively mild winter weather, which make it an important wintering ground for migratory bird species, especially waterfowl, on the Pacific Flyway.

Another result of the state's varying ecology is the 120 Important Bird Areas, such as the Jackson Bottom Wetlands Preserve, that are recognized as important conservation sites for birds. Many of these dedicated wildlife refuges have become meccas for birding enthusiasts, and Oregon has participated in formally organized birding activities such as the Christmas Bird Count since the early 1900s.

As an important U.S. region of bird diversity, Oregon has faced some serious challenges in protecting endangered and threatened avian species. In addition to high profile, threatened species such as the northern spotted owl and snowy plover, even many common species—including Oregon's state bird, the western meadowlark—have declined considerably due to hunting, habitat loss and other factors.

This list is presented in the taxonomic sequence of the Check-list of North and Middle American Birds, 7th edition through the 62nd Supplement, published by the American Ornithological Society (AOS). Common and scientific names are also those of the Check-list, except that the common names of families are from the Clements taxonomy because the AOS list does not include them.

Unless otherwise noted, all species listed below are considered to occur regularly in Oregon as permanent residents, summer or winter visitors, or migrants. These tags are used to annotate some species:

(R) Review list - birds that if seen require more comprehensive documentation than regularly seen species. 
(P) Provisional - "A review species, sight record only, no video or audio verification" per the OBRC
(I) Introduced - a species established as a result of human action

Ducks, geese, and waterfowl

Order: AnseriformesFamily: Anatidae

The family Anatidae includes the ducks and most duck-like waterfowl, such as geese and swans. These birds are adapted to an aquatic existence with webbed feet, bills which are flattened to a greater or lesser extent, and feathers that are excellent at shedding water due to special oils.

 Black-bellied whistling-duck, Dendrocygna autumnalis (R)
 Fulvous whistling-duck, Dendrocygna bicolor (R)
 Emperor goose, Anser canagica
 Snow goose, Anser caerulescens
 Ross's goose, Anser rossii
 Greater white-fronted goose, Anser albifrons
 Tundra bean-goose, Anser serrirostris (R)
 Brant, Branta bernicla
 Cackling goose, Branta hutchinsii
 Canada goose, Branta canadensis
 Trumpeter swan, Cygnus buccinator
 Tundra swan, Cygnus columbianus
 Whooper swan, Cygnus cygnus (R)
 Wood duck, Aix sponsa
 Baikal teal, Sibirionetta formosa (R)
 Garganey, Sibirionetta querquedula (R)
 Blue-winged teal, Spatula discors
 Cinnamon teal, Spatula cyanoptera
 Northern shoveler, Spatula clypeata
 Gadwall, Mareca strepera
 Falcated duck, Mareca falcata (R)
 Eurasian wigeon, Mareca penelope
 American wigeon, Mareca americana
 American black duck, Anas rubripes (R)
 Mallard, Anas platyrhynchos
 Northern pintail, Anas acuta
 Green-winged teal, Anas crecca
 Canvasback, Aythya valisineria
 Redhead, Aythya americana
 Ring-necked duck, Aythya collaris
 Tufted duck, Aythya fuligula
 Greater scaup, Aythya marila
 Lesser scaup, Aythya affinis
 Steller's eider, Polysticta stelleri (R)
 King eider, Somateria spectabilis (R)
 Common eider, Somateria mollissima (R)
 Harlequin duck, Histrionicus histrionicus
 Surf scoter, Melanitta perspicillata
 White-winged scoter, Melanitta deglandi
 Common scoter, Melanitta nigra (R)
 Black scoter, Melanitta americana
 Long-tailed duck, Clangula hyemalis
 Bufflehead, Bucephala albeola
 Common goldeneye, Bucephala clangula
 Barrow's goldeneye, Bucephala islandica
 Smew, Mergellus albellus (R)
 Hooded merganser, Lophodytes cucullatus
 Common merganser, Mergus merganser
 Red-breasted merganser, Mergus serrator
 Ruddy duck, Oxyura jamaicensis

New World quail

Order: GalliformesFamily: Odontophoridae

The New World quails are small, plump terrestrial birds only distantly related to the quails of the Old World, but named for their similar appearance and habits.

 Mountain quail, Oreortyx pictus
 Northern bobwhite, Colinus virginianus (I)(extirpated)
 California quail, Callipepla californica

Pheasants, grouse, and allies
Order: GalliformesFamily: Phasianidae

Phasianidae consists of the pheasants and their allies, including partridges, grouse, turkeys, and Old World quail. These are terrestrial species, variable in size but generally plump with broad relatively short wings. Many species are gamebirds or have been domesticated as a food source for humans.

 Wild turkey, Meleagris gallopavo (I)
 Ruffed grouse, Bonasa umbellus
 Greater sage-grouse, Centrocercus urophasianus
 Spruce grouse, Canachites canadensis
 Dusky grouse, Dendragapus obscurus
 Sooty grouse, Dendragapus fuliginosus
 Sharp-tailed grouse, Tympanuchus phasianellus (R)(extirpated)
 Chukar, Alectoris chukar (I)
 Gray partridge, Perdix perdix (I)
 Ring-necked pheasant, Phasianus colchicus (I)

Grebes

Order: PodicipediformesFamily: Podicipedidae

Grebes are small to medium-large freshwater diving birds. They have lobed toes and are excellent swimmers and divers. However, they have their feet placed far back on the body, making them quite ungainly on land.

 Pied-billed grebe, Podilymbus podiceps
 Horned grebe, Podiceps auritus
 Red-necked grebe, Podiceps grisegena
 Eared grebe, Podiceps nigricollis
 Western grebe, Aechmophorus occidentalis
 Clark's grebe, Aechmophorus clarkii

Pigeons and doves

Order: ColumbiformesFamily: Columbidae

Pigeons and doves are stout-bodied birds with short necks and short slender bills with a fleshy cere.

 Rock pigeon, Columba livia (I)
 Band-tailed pigeon, Patagioenas fasciata
 Eurasian collared-dove, Streptopelia decaocto (I)
 Common ground dove, Columbina passerina (R)
 White-winged dove, Zenaida asiatica
 Mourning dove, Zenaida macroura

Cuckoos

Order: CuculiformesFamily: Cuculidae

The family Cuculidae includes cuckoos, roadrunners, and anis. These birds are of variable size with slender bodies, long tails, and strong legs. The Old World cuckoos are brood parasites.

 Greater roadrunner, Geococcyx californianus (R) (P)
 Yellow-billed cuckoo, Coccyzus americanus (R)

Nightjars and allies
Order: CaprimulgiformesFamily: Caprimulgidae

Nightjars are medium-sized nocturnal birds that usually nest on the ground. They have long wings, short legs, and very short bills. Most have small feet, of little use for walking, and long pointed wings. Their soft plumage is cryptically colored to resemble bark or leaves.

 Lesser nighthawk, Chordeiles acutipennis (R)
 Common nighthawk, Chordeiles minor
 Common poorwill, Phalaenoptilus nuttallii
 Eastern whip-poor-will, Antrostomus vociferus (R)

Swifts
Order: ApodiformesFamily: Apodidae

The swifts are small birds which spend the majority of their lives flying. These birds have very short legs and never settle voluntarily on the ground, perching instead only on vertical surfaces. Many swifts have long swept-back wings which resemble a crescent or boomerang.

 Black swift, Cypseloides niger
 Chimney swift, Chaetura pelagica (R)
 Vaux's swift, Chaetura vauxi
 White-throated swift, Aeronautes saxatalis

Hummingbirds
Order: ApodiformesFamily: Trochilidae

Hummingbirds are small birds capable of hovering in mid-air due to the rapid flapping of their wings. They are the only birds that can fly backwards.

 Ruby-throated hummingbird, Archilochus colubris (R)
 Black-chinned hummingbird, Archilochus alexandri
 Anna's hummingbird, Calypte anna
 Costa's hummingbird, Calypte costae
 Calliope hummingbird, Selasphorus calliope
 Rufous hummingbird, Selasphorus rufus
 Allen's hummingbird, Selasphorus sasin
 Broad-tailed hummingbird, Selasphorus platycercus
 Broad-billed hummingbird, Cynanthus latirostris (R)

Rails, gallinules, and coots
Order: GruiformesFamily: Rallidae

Rallidae is a large family of small to medium-sized birds which includes the rails, crakes, coots, and gallinules. The most typical family members occupy dense vegetation in damp environments near lakes, swamps, or rivers. In general they are shy and secretive birds, making them difficult to observe. Most species have strong legs and long toes which are well adapted to soft uneven surfaces. They tend to have short, rounded wings and to be weak fliers.

 Virginia rail, Rallus limicola
 Sora, Porzana carolina
 Common gallinule, Gallinula galeata (R)
 American coot, Fulica americana
 Yellow rail, Coturnicops noveboracensis

Cranes
Order: GruiformesFamily: Gruidae

Cranes are large, long-legged, long-necked birds. Unlike the similar-looking but unrelated herons, cranes fly with necks outstretched, not pulled back. Most have elaborate and noisy courting displays or "dances".

 Sandhill crane, Antigone canadensis
 Common crane, Grus grus (R)

Stilts and avocets

Order: CharadriiformesFamily: Recurvirostridae

Recurvirostridae is a family of large wading birds which includes the avocets and stilts. The avocets have long legs and long up-curved bills. The stilts have extremely long legs and long, thin, straight bills.

 Black-necked stilt, Himantopus mexicanus
 American avocet, Recurvirostra americana

Oystercatchers

Order: CharadriiformesFamily: Haematopodidae

The oystercatchers are large, obvious, and noisy plover-like birds, with strong bills used for smashing or prising open molluscs.

 Black oystercatcher, Haematopus bachmani

Plovers and lapwings

Order: CharadriiformesFamily: Charadriidae

The family Charadriidae includes the plovers, dotterels, and lapwings. They are small to medium-sized birds with compact bodies, short thick necks, and long, usually pointed, wings. They are found in open country worldwide, mostly in habitats near water.

 Black-bellied plover, Pluvialis squatarola
 American golden-plover, Pluvialis dominica
 Pacific golden-plover, Pluvialis fulva
 Eurasian dotterel, Charadrius morinellus (R)
 Killdeer, Charadrius vociferus
 Semipalmated plover, Charadrius semipalmatus
 Piping plover, Charadrius melodus (R) (P)
 Lesser sand-plover, Charadrius mongolus (R)
 Wilson's plover, Charadrius wilsonia (R)
 Snowy plover, Charadrius nivosus
 Mountain plover, Charadrius montanus (R)

Sandpipers and allies

Order: CharadriiformesFamily: Scolopacidae

Scolopacidae is a large diverse family of small to medium-sized shorebirds including the sandpipers, curlews, godwits, shanks, tattlers, woodcocks, snipes, dowitchers, and phalaropes. The majority of these species eat small invertebrates picked out of the mud or soil. Different lengths of legs and bills enable multiple species to feed in the same habitat, particularly on the coast, without direct competition for food.

 Upland sandpiper, Bartramia longicauda (R)
 Bristle-thighed curlew, Numenius tahitiensis (R)
 Whimbrel, Numenius phaeopus
 Long-billed curlew, Numenius americanus
 Bar-tailed godwit, Limosa lapponica (R)
 Hudsonian godwit, Limosa haemastica (R)
 Marbled godwit, Limosa fedoa
 Ruddy turnstone, Arenaria interpres
 Black turnstone, Arenaria melanocephala
 Great knot, Calidris tenuirostris (R)
 Red knot, Calidris canutus
 Surfbird, Calidris virgata
 Ruff, Calidris pugnax
 Sharp-tailed sandpiper, Calidris acuminata
 Stilt sandpiper, Calidris himantopus
 Curlew sandpiper, Calidris ferruginea (R)
 Long-toed stint, Calidris subminuta (R)
 Red-necked stint, Calidris ruficollis (R)
 Sanderling, Calidris alba
 Dunlin, Calidris alpina
 Rock sandpiper, Calidris ptilocnemis
 Baird's sandpiper, Calidris bairdii
 Little stint, Calidris minuta (R)
 Least sandpiper, Calidris minutilla
 White-rumped sandpiper, Calidris fuscicollis (R)
 Buff-breasted sandpiper, Calidris subruficollis
 Pectoral sandpiper, Calidris melanotos
 Semipalmated sandpiper, Calidris pusilla
 Western sandpiper, Calidris mauri
 Short-billed dowitcher, Limnodromus griseus
 Long-billed dowitcher, Limnodromus scolopaceus
 Jack snipe, Lymnocryptes minimus (R)
 Wilson's snipe, Gallinago delicata
 Spotted sandpiper, Actitis macularius
 Solitary sandpiper, Tringa solitaria
 Wandering tattler, Tringa incanus
 Lesser yellowlegs, Tringa flavipes
 Willet, Tringa semipalmata
 Spotted redshank, Tringa erythropus (R)
 Greater yellowlegs, Tringa melanoleuca
 Wood sandpiper, Tringa glareola (R)
 Wilson's phalarope, Phalaropus tricolor
 Red-necked phalarope, Phalaropus lobatus
 Red phalarope, Phalaropus fulicarius

Skuas and jaegers

Order: CharadriiformesFamily: Stercorariidae

Skuas and jaegers are in general medium to large birds, typically with gray or brown plumage, often with white markings on the wings. They have longish bills with hooked tips and webbed feet with sharp claws. They look like large dark gulls, but have a fleshy cere above the upper mandible. They are strong, acrobatic fliers.

 South polar skua, Stercorarius maccormicki
 Pomarine jaeger, Stercorarius pomarinus
 Parasitic jaeger, Stercorarius parasiticus
 Long-tailed jaeger, Stercorarius longicaudus

Auks, murres, and puffins

Order: CharadriiformesFamily: Alcidae

Alcids are superficially similar to penguins due to their black-and-white colors, their upright posture, and some of their habits. However, they are only distantly related to the penguins and are able to fly. Auks live on the open sea, only deliberately coming ashore to nest.

 Common murre, Uria aalge
 Thick-billed murre, Uria lomvia (R)
 Pigeon guillemot, Cepphus columba
 Long-billed murrelet, Brachyramphus perdix (R)
 Marbled murrelet, Brachyramphus marmoratus
 Scripps's murrelet, Synthliboramphus scrippsi
 Guadalupe murrelet, Synthliboramphus hypoleucus (R)
 Ancient murrelet, Synthliboramphus antiquus
 Cassin's auklet, Ptychoramphus aleuticus
 Parakeet auklet, Aethia psittacula
 Rhinoceros auklet, Cerorhinca monocerata
 Horned puffin, Fratercula corniculata
 Tufted puffin, Fratercula cirrhata

Gulls, terns, and skimmers

Order: CharadriiformesFamily: Laridae

Laridae is a family of medium to large seabirds and includes gulls, terns, kittiwakes, and skimmers. They are typically gray or white, often with black markings on the head or wings. They have stout, longish bills and webbed feet.

 Black-legged kittiwake, Rissa tridactyla
 Red-legged kittiwake, Rissa brevirostris (R)
 Sabine's gull, Xema sabini
 Bonaparte's gull, Chroicocephalus philadelphia
 Black-headed gull, Chroicocephalus ridibundus (R)
 Little gull, Hydrocoloeus minutus (R)
 Ross's gull, Rhodostethia rosea (R)
 Laughing gull, Leucophaeus atricilla (R)
 Franklin's gull, Leucophaeus pipixcan
 Heermann's gull, Larus heermanni
 Short-billed gull, Larus brachyrhynchus
 Ring-billed gull, Larus delawarensis
 Western gull, Larus occidentalis
 California gull, Larus californicus
 Herring gull, Larus argentatus
 Iceland gull, Larus glaucoides
 Lesser black-backed gull, Larus fuscus (R)
 Slaty-backed gull, Larus schistisagus (R)
 Glaucous-winged gull, Larus glaucescens
 Glaucous gull, Larus hyperboreus
 Least tern, Sternula antillarum (R)
 Caspian tern, Hydroprogne caspia
 Black tern, Chlidonias niger
 Common tern, Sterna hirundo
 Arctic tern, Sterna paradisaea
 Forster's tern, Sterna forsteri
 Elegant tern, Thalasseus elegans
 Black skimmer, Rynchops niger (R) (P)

Tropicbirds
Order: PhaethontiformesFamily: Phaethontidae

Tropicbirds are slender white birds of tropical oceans with exceptionally long central tail feathers. Their long wings have black markings, as does the head.

 Red-billed tropicbird, Phaethon aethereus (R)

Loons 

Order: GaviiformesFamily: Gaviidae

Loons are aquatic birds, the size of a large duck, to which they are unrelated. Their plumage is largely gray or black, and they have spear-shaped bills. Loons swim well and fly adequately, but are almost hopeless on land, because their legs are placed towards the rear of the body.

 Red-throated loon, Gavia stellata
 Arctic loon, Gavia arctica (R)
 Pacific loon, Gavia pacifica
 Common loon, Gavia immer
 Yellow-billed loon, Gavia adamsii

Albatrosses

Order: ProcellariiformesFamily: Diomedeidae

The albatrosses are amongst the largest of flying birds, and the great albatrosses from the genus Diomedea have the largest wingspans of any extant birds.

 White-capped albatross, Thalassarche cauta (R)
 Wandering albatross, Diomedea exulans (R)
 Laysan albatross, Phoebastria immutabilis
 Black-footed albatross, Phoebastria nigripes
 Short-tailed albatross, Phoebastria albatrus (R)

Southern storm-petrels
Order: ProcellariiformesFamily: Oceanitidae

The storm-petrels are the smallest seabirds, relatives of the petrels, feeding on planktonic crustaceans and small fish picked from the surface, typically while hovering. The flight is fluttering and sometimes bat-like. Until 2018, this family's three species were included with the other storm-petrels in family Hydrobatidae.

 Wilson's storm-petrel, Oceanites oceanicus (R)

Northern storm-petrels
Order: ProcellariiformesFamily: Hydrobatidae

Though the members of this family are similar in many respects to the southern storm-petrels, including their general appearance and habits, there are enough genetic differences to warrant their placement in a separate family.

 Fork-tailed storm-petrel, Hydrobates furcatus
 Leach's storm-petrel, Hydrobates leucorhous
 Ashy storm-petrel, Hydrobates homochroa (R)
 Black storm-petrel, Hydrobates melania (R)

Shearwaters and petrels

Order: ProcellariiformesFamily: Procellariidae

The procellariids are the main group of medium-sized "true petrels", characterized by united nostrils with medium septum and a long outer functional primary.

 Northern fulmar, Fulmarus glacialis
 Murphy's petrel, Pterodroma ultima
 Mottled petrel, Pterodroma inexpectata
 Juan Fernandez petrel, Pterodroma externa (R) (P)
 Hawaiian petrel, Pterodroma sandwichensis
 Cook's petrel, Pterodroma cookii (R)
 Stejneger's petrel, Pterodroma longirostris (R) (P)
 Streaked shearwater, Calonectris leucomelas (R) (P)
 Wedge-tailed shearwater, Ardenna pacificus (R)
 Buller's shearwater, Ardenna bulleri
 Short-tailed shearwater, Ardenna tenuirostris
 Sooty shearwater, Ardenna griseus
 Great shearwater, Ardenna gravis (R)
 Pink-footed shearwater, Ardenna creatopus
 Flesh-footed shearwater, Ardenna carneipes
 Manx shearwater, Puffinus puffinus
 Black-vented shearwater, Puffinus opisthomelas (R) (P)

Frigatebirds
Order: SuliformesFamily: Fregatidae

Frigatebirds are large seabirds usually found over tropical oceans. They are large, black or black-and-white, with long wings and deeply forked tails. The males have colored inflatable throat pouches. They do not swim or walk and cannot take off from a flat surface. Having the largest wingspan-to-body-weight ratio of any bird, they are essentially aerial, able to stay aloft for more than a week.

 Magnificent frigatebird, Fregata magnificens (R)

Boobies and gannets

Order: SuliformesFamily: Sulidae

The sulids comprise the gannets and boobies. Both groups are medium-large coastal seabirds that plunge-dive for fish.

 Masked booby, Sula dactylatra (R)
 Nazca booby, Sula granti (R)
 Blue-footed booby, Sula nebouxii (R)
 Brown booby, Sula leucogaster (R)
 Red-footed booby, Sula sula (R)

Cormorants and shags

Order: SuliformesFamily: Phalacrocoracidae

Cormorants are medium-to-large aquatic birds, usually with mainly dark plumage and areas of colored skin on the face. The bill is long, thin, and sharply hooked. Their feet are four-toed and webbed.

 Brandt's cormorant, Urile penicillatus
 Pelagic cormorant, Nannopterum auritum
 Double-crested cormorant, Nannopterum brasilianum

Pelicans
Order: PelecaniformesFamily: Pelecanidae

Pelicans are very large water birds with a distinctive pouch under their beak. Like other birds in the order Pelecaniformes, they have four webbed toes.

 American white pelican, Pelecanus erythrorhynchos
 Brown pelican, Pelecanus occidentalis

Herons, egrets, and bitterns

Order: PelecaniformesFamily: Ardeidae

The family Ardeidae contains the herons, egrets, and bitterns. Herons and egrets are medium to large wading birds with long necks and legs. Bitterns tend to be shorter-necked and more secretive. Members of Ardeidae fly with their necks retracted, unlike other long-necked birds such as storks, ibises, and spoonbills.

 American bittern, Botaurus lentiginosus
 Least bittern, Ixobrychus exilis (R)
 Great blue heron, Ardea herodias
 Great egret, Ardea alba
 Snowy egret, Egretta thula
 Little blue heron, Egretta caerulea (R)
 Tricolored heron, Egretta tricolor (R)
 Cattle egret, Bubulcus ibis
 Green heron, Butorides virescens
 Black-crowned night-heron, Nycticorax nycticorax
 Yellow-crowned night-heron, Nyctanassa violacea (R)

Ibises and spoonbills
Order: PelecaniformesFamily: Threskiornithidae

The family Threskiornithidae includes the ibises and spoonbills. They have long, broad wings. Their bodies tend to be elongated, the neck more so, with rather long legs. The bill is also long, decurved in the case of the ibises, straight and distinctively flattened in the spoonbills.

 White ibis, Eudocimus albus (R)
 Glossy ibis, Plegadis falcinellus (R)
 White-faced ibis, Plegadis chihi

New World vultures
Order: CathartiformesFamily: Cathartidae

The New World vultures are not closely related to Old World vultures, but superficially resemble them because of convergent evolution. Like the Old World vultures, they are scavengers. However, unlike Old World vultures, which find carcasses by sight, New World vultures have a good sense of smell with which they locate carcasses.

 California condor, Gymnogyps californianus (R) extirpated
 Black vulture, Coragyps atratus (R)
 Turkey vulture, Cathartes aura

Osprey

Order: AccipitriformesFamily: Pandionidae

Pandionidae is a monotypic family of fish-eating birds of prey.  Its single species possesses a very large and powerful hooked beak, strong legs, strong talons, and keen eyesight.

 Osprey, Pandion haliaetus

Hawks, eagles, and kites
Order: AccipitriformesFamily: Accipitridae

Accipitridae is a family of birds of prey which includes hawks, eagles, kites, harriers, and Old World vultures. These birds have very large powerful hooked beaks for tearing flesh from their prey, strong legs, powerful talons, and keen eyesight.

 White-tailed kite, Elanus leucurus
 Golden eagle, Aquila chrysaetos
 Northern harrier, Circus hudsonius
 Sharp-shinned hawk, Accipiter striatus
 Cooper's hawk, Accipiter cooperii
 Northern goshawk, Accipiter gentilis
 Bald eagle, Haliaeetus leucocephalus
 Red-shouldered hawk, Buteo lineatus
 Broad-winged hawk, Buteo platypterus
 Swainson's hawk, Buteo swainsoni
 Zone-tailed hawk, Buteo albonotatus (R)
 Red-tailed hawk, Buteo jamaicensis
 Rough-legged hawk, Buteo lagopus
 Ferruginous hawk, Buteo regalis

Barn-owls
Order: StrigiformesFamily: Tytonidae

Barn-owls are medium to large owls with large heads and characteristic heart-shaped faces. They have long strong legs with powerful talons.

 Barn owl, Tyto alba

Owls

Order: StrigiformesFamily: Strigidae

Typical owls are small to large solitary nocturnal birds of prey. They have large forward-facing eyes and ears, a hawk-like beak, and a conspicuous circle of feathers around each eye called a facial disk.

 Flammulated owl, Psiloscops flammeolus
 Western screech-owl, Megascops kennicottii
 Great horned owl, Bubo virginianus
 Snowy owl, Bubo scandiacus
 Northern hawk owl, Surnia ulula (R)
 Northern pygmy-owl, Glaucidium gnoma
 Burrowing owl, Athene cunicularia
 Spotted owl, Strix occidentalis
 Barred owl, Strix varia
 Great gray owl, Strix nebulosa
 Long-eared owl, Asio otus
 Short-eared owl, Asio flammeus
 Boreal owl, Aegolius funereus
 Northern saw-whet owl, Aegolius acadicus

Kingfishers
Order: CoraciiformesFamily: Alcedinidae

Kingfishers are medium-sized birds with large heads, long pointed bills, short legs, and stubby tails.

 Belted kingfisher, Megaceryle alcyon

Woodpeckers

Order: PiciformesFamily: Picidae

Woodpeckers are small to medium-sized birds with chisel-like beaks, short legs, stiff tails, and long tongues used for capturing insects. Some species have feet with two toes pointing forward and two backward, while several species have only three toes. Many woodpeckers have the habit of tapping noisily on tree trunks with their beaks.

 Lewis's woodpecker, Melanerpes lewis
 Red-headed woodpecker, Melanerpes erythrocephalus (R)
 Acorn woodpecker, Melanerpes formicivorus
 Red-bellied woodpecker, Melanerpes carolinus (R)
 Williamson's sapsucker, Sphyrapicus thyroideus
 Yellow-bellied sapsucker, Sphyrapicus varius
 Red-naped sapsucker, Sphyrapicus nuchalis
 Red-breasted sapsucker, Sphyrapicus ruber
 American three-toed woodpecker, Picoides dorsalis
 Black-backed woodpecker, Picoides arcticus
 Downy woodpecker, Dryobates pubescens
 Nuttall's woodpecker, Dryobates nuttallii (R)
 Hairy woodpecker, Dryobates villosus
 White-headed woodpecker, Dryobates albolarvatus
 Northern flicker, Colaptes auratus
 Pileated woodpecker, Dryocopus pileatus

Falcons and caracaras

Order: FalconiformesFamily: Falconidae

Falconidae is a family of diurnal birds of prey, notably the falcons and caracaras. They differ from hawks, eagles, and kites in that they kill with their beaks instead of their talons.

 Crested caracara, Caracara plancus (R)
 American kestrel, Falco sparverius
 Merlin, Falco columbarius
 Gyrfalcon, Falco rusticolus
 Peregrine falcon, Falco peregrinus
 Prairie falcon, Falco mexicanus

Tyrant flycatchers

Order: PasseriformesFamily: Tyrannidae

Tyrant flycatchers are Passerine birds which occur throughout North and South America. They superficially resemble the Old World flycatchers, but are more robust and have stronger bills. They do not have the sophisticated vocal capabilities of the songbirds. Most, but not all, are rather plain. As the name implies, most are insectivorous.

 Dusky-capped flycatcher, Myiarchus tuberculifer (R)
 Ash-throated flycatcher, Myiarchus cinerascens
 Great crested flycatcher, Myiarchus crinitus (R)
 Tropical kingbird, Tyrannus melancholicus
 Cassin's kingbird, Tyrannus vociferans (R)
 Western kingbird, Tyrannus verticalis
 Eastern kingbird, Tyrannus tyrannus
 Scissor-tailed flycatcher, Tyrannus forficatus (R)
 Olive-sided flycatcher, Contopus cooperi
 Western wood-pewee, Contopus sordidulus
 Eastern wood-pewee, Contopus virens (R)
 Yellow-bellied flycatcher, Empidonax flaviventris (R)
 Alder flycatcher, Empidonax alnorum (R)
 Willow flycatcher, Empidonax traillii
 Least flycatcher, Empidonax minimus
 Hammond's flycatcher, Empidonax hammondii
 Gray flycatcher, Empidonax wrightii
 Dusky flycatcher, Empidonax oberholseri
 Pacific-slope flycatcher, Empidonax difficilis
 Cordilleran flycatcher, Empidonax occidentalis
 Black phoebe, Sayornis nigricans
 Eastern phoebe, Sayornis phoebe (R)
 Say's phoebe, Sayornis saya
 Vermilion flycatcher, Pyrocephalus rubinus (R)

Vireos, shrike-babblers, and erpornis

Order: PasseriformesFamily: Vireonidae

The vireos and greenlets are a group of small to medium-sized passerine birds mostly restricted to the New World, though a few members of the family, called shrike-babblers, are found in Asia. They are typically greenish in color and resemble wood-warblers apart from their heavier bills

 White-eyed vireo, Vireo griseus (R)
 Bell's vireo, Vireo bellii (R) (P)
 Hutton's vireo, Vireo huttoni
 Yellow-throated vireo, Vireo flavifrons (R)
 Cassin's vireo, Vireo cassinii
 Blue-headed vireo, Vireo solitarius (R)
 Plumbeous vireo, Vireo plumbeus (R)
 Philadelphia vireo, Vireo philadelphicus (R)
 Warbling vireo, Vireo gilvus
 Red-eyed vireo, Vireo olivaceus

Shrikes
Order: PasseriformesFamily: Laniidae

Shrikes are passerine birds known for their habit of catching other birds and small animals and impaling the uneaten portions of their bodies on thorns. A shrike's beak is hooked, like that of a typical bird of prey.

 Loggerhead shrike, Lanius ludovicianus
 Northern shrike, Lanius borealis

Crows, jays, and magpies

Order: PasseriformesFamily: Corvidae

The family Corvidae includes crows, ravens, jays, choughs, magpies, treepies, nutcrackers, and ground jays. Corvids are above average in size among the Passeriformes, and some of the larger species show high levels of intelligence.

 Canada jay, Perisoreus canadensis
 Pinyon jay, Gymnorhinus cyanocephalus
 Steller's jay, Cyanocitta stelleri
 Blue jay, Cyanocitta cristata
 California scrub-jay, Aphelocoma californica
 Woodhouse's scrub-jay, Aphelocoma woodhouseii 
 Clark's nutcracker, Nucifraga columbiana
 Black-billed magpie, Pica hudsonia
 American crow, Corvus brachyrhynchos
 Common raven, Corvus corax

Tits, chickadees, and titmice

Order: PasseriformesFamily: Paridae

The Paridae are mainly small stocky woodland species with short stout bills. Some have crests. They are adaptable birds, with a mixed diet including seeds and insects.

 Black-capped chickadee, Poecile atricapillus
 Mountain chickadee, Poecile gambeli
 Chestnut-backed chickadee, Poecile rufescens
 Oak titmouse, Baeolophus inornatus
 Juniper titmouse, Baeolophus ridgwayi

Larks
Order: PasseriformesFamily: Alaudidae

Larks are small terrestrial birds with often extravagant songs and display flights. Most larks are fairly dull in appearance. Their food is insects and seeds.

 Eurasian skylark, Alauda arvensis (R)
 Horned lark, Eremophila alpestris

Swallows

Order: PasseriformesFamily: Hirundinidae

The family Hirundinidae is adapted to aerial feeding. They have a slender streamlined body, long pointed wings, and a short bill with a wide gape. The feet are adapted to perching rather than walking, and the front toes are partially joined at the base.

 Bank swallow, Riparia riparia
 Tree swallow, Tachycineta bicolor
 Violet-green swallow, Tachycineta thalassina
 Northern rough-winged swallow, Stelgidopteryx serripennis
 Purple martin, Progne subis
 Barn swallow, Hirundo rustica
 Cliff swallow, Petrochelidon pyrrhonota
 Cave swallow, Petrochelidon fulva (R)

Long-tailed tits
Order: PasseriformesFamily: Aegithalidae

The long-tailed tits are a family of small passerine birds with medium to long tails. They make woven bag nests in trees. Most eat a mixed diet which includes insects.

 Bushtit, Psaltriparus minimus

Leaf warblers
Order: PasseriformesFamily: Phylloscopidae

Leaf warblers are a family of small insectivorous birds found mostly in Eurasia and ranging into Wallacea and Africa. The Arctic warbler breeds east into Alaska. The species are of various sizes, often green-plumaged above and yellow below, or more subdued with grayish-green to grayish-brown colors.

 Dusky warbler, Phylloscopus fuscatus (R)
 Arctic warbler, Phylloscopus borealis (R)

Sylviid warblers, parrotbills, and allies
Order: PasseriformesFamily: Sylviidae

The family Sylviidae is a group of small insectivorous passerine birds. They mainly occur as breeding species, as the common name implies, in Europe, Asia, and to a lesser extent Africa. Most are of generally undistinguished appearance, but many have distinctive songs.

 Wrentit, Chamaea fasciata

Kinglets
Order: PasseriformesFamily: Regulidae

The kinglets are a small family of birds which resemble the titmice. They are very small insectivorous birds. The adults have colored crowns, giving rise to their name.

 Ruby-crowned kinglet, Corphylio calendula
 Golden-crowned kinglet, Regulus satrapa

Waxwings

Order: PasseriformesFamily: Bombycillidae

The waxwings are a group of birds with soft silky plumage and unique red tips to some of the wing feathers. In the Bohemian and cedar waxwings, these tips look like sealing wax and give the group its name. These are arboreal birds of northern forests. They live on insects in summer and berries in winter.

 Bohemian waxwing, Bombycilla garrulus
 Cedar waxwing, Bombycilla cedrorum

Silky-flycatchers
Order: PasseriformesFamily: Ptiliogonatidae

The silky-flycatchers are a small family of passerine birds which occur mainly in Central America. They are related to waxwings and most species have small crests.

 Phainopepla, Phainopepla nitens (R)

Nuthatches

Order: PasseriformesFamily: Sittidae

Nuthatches are small woodland birds. They have the unusual ability to climb down trees head first, unlike other birds which can only go upwards. Nuthatches have big heads, short tails, and powerful bills and feet.

 Red-breasted nuthatch, Sitta canadensis
 White-breasted nuthatch, Sitta carolinensis
 Pygmy nuthatch, Sitta pygmaea

Treecreepers
Order: PasseriformesFamily: Certhiidae

Treecreepers are small woodland birds, brown above and white below. They have thin pointed down-curved bills, which they use to extricate insects from bark. They have stiff tail feathers, like woodpeckers, which they use to support themselves on vertical trees.

 Brown creeper, Certhia americana

Gnatcatchers
Order: PasseriformesFamily: Polioptilidae

These dainty birds resemble Old World warblers in their structure and habits, moving restlessly through the foliage seeking insects. The gnatcatchers are mainly soft bluish gray in color and have the typical insectivore's long sharp bill. Many species have distinctive black head patterns (especially males) and long, regularly cocked, black-and-white tails.

 Blue-gray gnatcatcher, Polioptila caerulea

Wrens

Order: PasseriformesFamily: Troglodytidae

Wrens are small and inconspicuous birds, except for their loud songs. They have short wings and thin down-turned bills. Several species often hold their tails upright. All are insectivorous.

 Rock wren, Salpinctes obsoletus
 Canyon wren, Catherpes mexicanus
 House wren, Troglodytes aedon
 Pacific wren, Troglodytes pacificus
 Winter wren, Troglodytes hiemalis (R)
 Sedge wren, Cistothorus platensis (R)
 Marsh wren, Cistothorus palustris
 Bewick's wren, Thryomanes bewickii

Mockingbirds and thrashers
Order: PasseriformesFamily: Mimidae

The mimids are a family of passerine birds which includes thrashers, mockingbirds, tremblers, and the New World catbirds. These birds are notable for their vocalization, especially their remarkable ability to mimic a wide variety of birds and other sounds heard outdoors. The species tend towards dull grays and browns in their appearance.

 Gray catbird, Dumetella carolinensis
 Curve-billed thrasher, Toxostoma curvirostre (R) (P)
 Brown thrasher, Toxostoma rufum
 California thrasher, Toxostoma redivivum (R)
 Sage thrasher, Oreoscoptes montanus
 Northern mockingbird, Mimus polyglottos

Starlings
Order: PasseriformesFamily: Sturnidae

Starlings are small to medium-sized Old World passerine birds with strong feet. Their flight is strong and direct and most are very gregarious. Their preferred habitat is fairly open country, and they eat insects and fruit. The plumage of several species is dark with a metallic sheen.

 European starling, Sturnus vulgaris (I)

Dippers

Order: PasseriformesFamily: Cinclidae

Dippers are a group of perching birds whose habitat includes aquatic environments in the Americas, Europe, and Asia. They are named for their bobbing or dipping movements. These birds have adaptations which allows them to submerge and walk on the bottom to feed on insect larvae.

 American dipper, Cinclus mexicanus

Thrushes and allies

Order: PasseriformesFamily: Turdidae

The thrushes are a group of passerine birds that occur mainly but not exclusively in the Old World. They are plump, soft plumaged, small to medium-sized insectivores or sometimes omnivores, often feeding on the ground. Many have attractive songs.

 Eastern bluebird, Sialia sialis (R)
 Western bluebird, Sialia mexicana
 Mountain bluebird, Sialia currucoides
 Townsend's solitaire, Myadestes townsendi
 Veery, Catharus fuscescens
 Gray-cheeked thrush, Catharus minimus (R)
 Swainson's thrush, Catharus ustulatus
 Hermit thrush, Catharus guttatus
 Wood thrush, Hylocichla mustelina (R)
 Dusky thrush, Turdus naumanni (R)
 American robin, Turdus migratorius
 Varied thrush, Ixoreus naevius

Old World flycatchers
Order: PasseriformesFamily: Muscicapidae

The Old World flycatchers form a large family of small passerine birds. These are mainly small arboreal insectivores, many of which, as the name implies, take their prey on the wing.

 Red-flanked bluetail, Tarsiger cyanurus (R)
 Northern wheatear, Oenanthe oenanthe (R)

Old World sparrows
Order: PasseriformesFamily: Passeridae

Old World sparrows are small passerine birds. In general, sparrows tend to be small plump brownish or grayish birds with short tails and short powerful beaks. Sparrows are seed eaters, but they also consume small insects.

 House sparrow, Passer domesticus (I)

Wagtails and pipits

Order: PasseriformesFamily: Motacillidae

Motacillidae is a family of small passerine birds with medium to long tails. They include the wagtails, longclaws, and pipits. They are slender ground-feeding insectivores of open country.

 Eastern yellow wagtail, Motacilla tschutschensis (R)
 White wagtail, Montacilla alba (R)
 Red-throated pipit, Anthus cervinus (R)
 American pipit, Anthus rubescens
 Sprague's pipit, Anthus spragueii (R)

Finches, euphonias, and allies

Order: PasseriformesFamily: Fringillidae

Finches are seed-eating passerine birds that are small to moderately large and have a strong beak, usually conical and in some species very large. All have twelve tail feathers and nine primaries. These birds have a bouncing flight with alternating bouts of flapping and gliding on closed wings, and most sing well.

 Brambling, Fringilla montifringilla (R)
 Evening grosbeak, Coccothraustes vespertinus
 Pine grosbeak, Pinicola enucleator
 Gray-crowned rosy-finch, Leucosticte tephrocotis
 Black rosy-finch, Leucosticte atrata
 House finch, Haemorhous mexicanus
 Purple finch, Haemorhous purpureus
 Cassin's finch, Haemorhous cassinii
 Oriental greenfinch, Chloris sinica (R)
 Common redpoll, Acanthis flammea
 Hoary redpoll, Acanthis hornemanni (R)
 Red crossbill, Loxia curvirostra
 White-winged crossbill, Loxia leucoptera
 Pine siskin, Spinus pinus
 Lesser goldfinch, Spinus psaltria
 Lawrence's goldfinch, Spinus lawrencei (R)
 American goldfinch, Spinus tristis

Longspurs and snow buntings
Order: PasseriformesFamily: Calcariidae

The Calcariidae are a group of passerine birds that had been traditionally grouped with the New World sparrows, but differ in a number of respects and are usually found in open grassy areas.

 Lapland longspur, Calcarius lapponicus
 Chestnut-collared longspur, Calcarius ornatus
 Smith's longspur, Calcarius pictus (R)
 Thick-billed longspur, Rhynchophanes mccownii (R)
 Snow bunting, Plectrophenax nivalis
 McKay's bunting, Plectrophenax hyperboreus (R)

Old World buntings
Order: PasseriformesFamily: Emberizidae

Emberizidae is a family of passerine birds containing a single genus. Until 2017, the New World sparrows (Passerellidae) were also considered part of this family.

 Little bunting, Emberiza pusilla (R)
 Rustic bunting, Emberiza rustica (R)

New World sparrows

Order: PasseriformesFamily: Passerellidae

Until 2017, these species were considered part of the family Emberizidae. Most of the species are known as sparrows, but these birds are not closely related to the Old World sparrows which are in the family Passeridae. Many of these have distinctive head patterns.
 Cassin's sparrow, Peucaea cassinii (R)

 Grasshopper sparrow, Ammodramus savannarum
 Black-throated sparrow, Amphispiza bilineata
 Lark sparrow, Chondestes grammacus
 Lark bunting, Calamospiza melanocorys
 Chipping sparrow, Spizella passerina
 Clay-colored sparrow, Spizella pallida
 Black-chinned sparrow, Spizella atrogularis (R)
 Brewer's sparrow, Spizella breweri
 Fox sparrow, Passerella iliaca
 American tree sparrow, Spizelloides arborea
 Dark-eyed junco, Junco hyemalis
 White-crowned sparrow, Zonotrichia leucophrys
 Golden-crowned sparrow, Zonotrichia atricapilla
 Harris's sparrow, Zonotrichia querula
 White-throated sparrow, Zonotrichia albicollis
 Sagebrush sparrow, Artemisiospiza nevadensis
 Vesper sparrow, Pooecetes gramineus
 LeConte's sparrow, Ammospiza leconteii (R)
 Savannah sparrow, Passerculus sandwichensis
 Song sparrow, Melospiza melodia
 Lincoln's sparrow, Melospiza lincolnii
 Swamp sparrow, Melospiza georgiana
 California towhee, Melozone crissalis
 Green-tailed towhee, Pipilo chlorurus
 Spotted towhee, Pipilo maculatus
 Eastern towhee, Pipilo erythrophthalmus (R)

Yellow-breasted chat
Order: PasseriformesFamily: Icteriidae

This species was historically placed in the wood-warblers (Parulidae) but nonetheless most authorities were unsure if it belonged there. It was placed in its own family in 2017

 Yellow-breasted chat, Icteria virens

Troupials and allies
Order: PasseriformesFamily: Icteridae

The icterids are a group of small to medium-sized, often colorful passerine birds restricted to the New World and include the grackles, New World blackbirds, and New World orioles. Most species have black as a predominant plumage color, often enlivened by yellow, orange, or red.

 Yellow-headed blackbird, Xanthocephalus xanthocephalus
 Bobolink, Dolichonyx oryzivorus
 Western meadowlark, Sturnella neglecta
 Orchard oriole, Icterus spurius (R)
 Hooded oriole, Icterus cucullatus
 Streak-backed oriole, Icterus pustulatus (R)
 Bullock's oriole, Icterus bullockii
 Baltimore oriole, Icterus galbula (R)
 Scott's oriole, Icterus parisorum (R)
 Red-winged blackbird, Agelaius phoeniceus
 Tricolored blackbird, Agelaius tricolor
 Brown-headed cowbird, Molothrus ater
 Rusty blackbird, Euphagus carolinus
 Brewer's blackbird, Euphagus cyanocephalus
 Common grackle, Quiscalus quiscula (R)
 Great-tailed grackle, Quiscalus mexicanus

New World warblers

Order: PasseriformesFamily: Parulidae

The wood warblers are a group of small and often colorful passerine birds restricted to the New World. Most are arboreal, but some are more terrestrial. Most members of this family are insectivores.

 Ovenbird, Seiurus aurocapilla
 Worm-eating warbler, Helmitheros vermivorum (R) (P)
 Louisiana waterthrush, Parkesia motacilla (R)
 Northern waterthrush, Parkesia noveboracensis
 Golden-winged warbler, Vermivora chrysoptera (R)
 Blue-winged warbler, Vermivora cyanoptera (R)
 Black-and-white warbler, Mniotilta varia
 Prothonotary warbler, Protonotaria citrea (R)
 Tennessee warbler, Leiothlypis peregrina
 Orange-crowned warbler, Leiothlypis celata
 Lucy's warbler, Leiothlypis luciae (R)
 Nashville warbler, Leiothlypis ruficapilla
 Virginia's warbler, Leiothlypis virginiae (R)
 MacGillivray's warbler, Geothlypis tolmiei
 Mourning warbler, Geothlypis philadelphia (R)
 Kentucky warbler, Geothlypis formosa (R)
 Common yellowthroat, Geothlypis trichas
 Hooded warbler, Setophaga citrina (R)
 American redstart, Setophaga ruticilla
 Cape May warbler, Setophaga tigrina (R)
 Northern parula, Setophaga americana
 Magnolia warbler, Setophaga magnolia
 Bay-breasted warbler, Setophaga castanea (R)
 Blackburnian warbler, Setophaga fusca (R)
 Yellow warbler, Setophaga petechia
 Chestnut-sided warbler, Setophaga pensylvanica
 Blackpoll warbler, Setophaga striata
 Black-throated blue warbler, Setophaga caerulescens
 Palm warbler, Setophaga palmarum
 Pine warbler, Setophaga pinus (R)
 Yellow-rumped warbler, Setophaga coronata
 Yellow-throated warbler, Setophaga dominica (R)
 Prairie warbler, Setophaga discolor (R)
 Black-throated gray warbler, Setophaga nigrescens
 Townsend's warbler, Setophaga townsendi
 Hermit warbler, Setophaga occidentalis
 Black-throated green warbler, Setophaga virens (R)
 Canada warbler, Cardellina canadensis (R)
 Wilson's warbler, Cardellina pusilla
 Painted redstart, Myioborus pictus (R) (P)

Cardinals and allies

Order: PasseriformesFamily: Cardinalidae

The cardinals are a family of robust seed-eating birds with strong bills. They are typically associated with open woodland. The sexes usually have distinct plumages.

 Summer tanager, Piranga rubra (R)
 Scarlet tanager, Piranga olivacea (R)
 Western tanager, Piranga ludoviciana
 Pyrrhuloxia, Cardinalis sinuatus (R)
 Rose-breasted grosbeak, Pheucticus ludovicianus
 Black-headed grosbeak, Pheucticus melanocephalus
 Blue grosbeak, Passerina caerulea (R)
 Lazuli bunting, Passerina amoena
 Indigo bunting, Passerina cyanea
 Painted bunting, Passerina ciris (R)
 Dickcissel, Spiza americana (R)

See also

 Amphibians and reptiles of Oregon
 Audubon Society of Portland
 List of birds of the Klamath Basin
 List of native Oregon plants
 Lists of Oregon-related topics

References

Biota of Oregon
Oregon
Birds